Cogo is a village and township in the Tibet Autonomous Region, in China.

Populated places in Shigatse
Tingri County
Township-level divisions of Tibet